The 2015 BRD Bucharest Open was a professional tennis tournament played on red clay courts. It was the 2nd edition of the tournament and part of the 2015 WTA Tour. It took place at Arenele BNR in Bucharest, Romania between 13 and 19 July 2015.

Points and prize money

Point distribution

Prize money

Singles main-draw entrants

Seeds 

 1 Rankings as of June 29, 2015.

Other entrants 
The following players received wildcards into the main draw:
  Ana Bogdan
  Sorana Cîrstea
  Patricia Maria Țig

The following players received entry from the qualifying draw:
  Cristina Dinu
  Réka-Luca Jani
  Darya Kasatkina
  Petra Martić

Withdrawals 
Before the tournament
  Karin Knapp →replaced by Shuai Zhang
  Ana Konjuh →replaced by Anna Tatishvili
  Magda Linette →replaced by Shahar Pe'er
  Pauline Parmentier →replaced by Çağla Büyükakçay

Retirements 
  Alexandra Dulgheru (right knee injury)
  Sílvia Soler Espinosa (right shoulder injury)

WTA doubles main-draw entrants

Seeds 

 1 Rankings as of June 29, 2015.

Other entrants 
The following pairs received wildcards into the main draw:
  Jaqueline Cristian /  Elena Ruse
  Andreea Mitu /  Patricia Maria Țig
The following pair received entry as alternates:
  Cristina Dinu /  Camelia Hristea

Withdrawals
Before the tournament
  Shahar Pe'er (right shoulder injury)

Champions

Singles 

  Anna Karolína Schmiedlová def.  Sara Errani, 7–6(7–3), 6–3

Doubles 

  Oksana Kalashnikova /  Demi Schuurs def.  Andreea Mitu /  Patricia Maria Țig, 6–2, 6–2

References 
 WTA draw 2015 Bucharest Open

External links 

Official website
 

BRD Bucharest Open
BRD Bucharest Open
2015 in Romanian tennis
July 2015 sports events in Romania